Muhd Arfy Qhairant Amran is a Malaysian male  track cyclist. He competed at the 2011 and 2012 UCI Track Cycling World Championships.

References

External links
 Profile at cyclingarchives.com

Year of birth missing (living people)
Living people
Malaysian track cyclists
Malaysian male cyclists
Place of birth missing (living people)
20th-century Malaysian people
21st-century Malaysian people